Adam Alilet (born 21 July 1997) is an Algerian footballer who plays for USM Alger in the Algerian Ligue Professionnelle 1.

In 2019, Adam Alilet was promoted to USM Alger's first team.
On 30 October 2019, Adam Alilet made his first league appearance against NC Magra.

References

External links
 

1999 births
Living people
Algerian footballers
Association football defenders
USM Alger players
21st-century Algerian people